Ainnurruvar is a medieval merchant guild originating in the Tamil Nadu region of India between the eighth and 13th centuries. In this period, organised merchant guilds exerted considerable power and influence. Ainnurruvar  was one of the most prominent of these guilds.  During the Chola Empire they were regarded as the elite amongst the South Indian merchant organizations.

Origins

A Tamil inscription of 1088 A.D. found in Sumatra, Indonesia refers to the "Nagarathar Senapathi Nattu cettiar" as belonging to the Ainnurruvar group.  By the twelfth century, the Ainnuruvars' had encompassed other trading guilds to arise as a dominating force. For instance the Manigram Nagarattam states itself to be a subsidiary group.

An inscription in Piranmalai makes references to "cetti"s as "flourishing" and as "being integral to the Tisai Ayirattu Ainnurruvar organization and occupying 18 pattinams, 32 valarpurams (major trade centres) and 64 Kadigai valams.  Significantly the number 18 resembles the name of one of the seven geographical divisions (Pathinettu uur vattahai) and 32 plus 64 equate to the legendary count of 96 Villages of the Nattukkottai Chettiars. The Piranmalai inscriptions (13th century) also speak of the Ainnurruvar, the Manigrammam of Kodumbalur (near Pudukkottai) and Nagarathars as far away as from Kerala and Sinhala (Refer the "Kerala Singa Vala Nadu" phrase in Nagarathar marriage settlements (Isaikkudimanam) coming together to donate huge funds for the temple.(The Trading world of the Tamil merchant: Evolution of merchant capitalism in the Coramandal By Kanakalatha Mukund).

The association between the Cholas and the Ainnurruvar has been well established from the number of finds of Ainnurruvar inscriptions. The maximum number of Ainnurruvar inscriptions have occurred during the Chola dynasty that lasted between the 10th and 13th centuries. Most importantly the 1088 inscription of Sumatra (reign of Kulothunga I) and the 1036 A.D.(Rajendra I) inscription in Sri Lanka establish the close association between the Ainnurruvar community and the Cholas beyond doubt.According to Prof.Champakalakshmi, the Ainnurruvar moved in wherever the Cholas had conquered.

There is no clear reference to the end of this guild and there have been some mentions of the tensions between the descendants of this guild and the British Empire. Their total span of existence might have been ten decades.

Organization
The members of this guild were managed by the "Pancha Sata Vira Sasana" or the edict of five hundred. At various times their headquarters was declared to be in neelampur in Erode district.

The Ainnurruvar had their own armies to escort their caravans (The Sri Lankan inscription clearly establishes this) and merchant ships. There are references to a regiment named "Pazhi Ili Ainnurruvar" in the Chola records. While this regiment could have been named after "Pazhi Ili" of the Mutharaiyar clan, the occurrence of the term "Ainnurruvar" is curious. These armies were evidently lent in support of the Chola expeditions.  Contrary to the earlier view that the purpose of Rajendra's expedition to South East Asia may have been to plunder, the more recent view which is also supported by available evidence is that the raids were conducted to clear piracy from and to gain control over the sea lanes of the Melakka Straits that served as the gateway to the Far East for the Indian merchant ships. A partly Tamil and partly Chinese inscriptions (1281 A.D.) found in China and other references to the Chola emissaries to the Chinese court and vice versa stand testimony to the significant volumes of trade between the Tamil country and the Far East including China.

The guild taxed its members as a percentage of revenues. This tax had to paid in advance to gain membership.
The guild has also been noted to do charity work to develop villages and temples.

Trade Dynamics
According to Anthony Reid (Verandah of Violence - the background to the Aceh problem), there are numerous evidences to Tamil mercantile activities in Aceh, northern Sumatra during the early part of the second millennium. He thinks some of the ships that ferried between Tamilakham and Sumatra could have been salt carrying ships. They were also known to trade in Areca, Iron, Cotton yarn and perhaps even cloth.

They were known to have Marketing relationships with the traders of Sri Lanka and dominated the trade route between South India and Sri Lanka.

Legacy
Kanakalatha Mukund argues that the period from 900 to 1300 set the stage for evolution of trade into corporate and commercial institutions. She says the apprenticeship practices of the Tamil traders mentioned by Marco Polo, the European traveller, resemble those followed by Nattukkottai Chettiars even today.

A Later Chola (reign of Sundara Chola 957-973 A.D) inscription in Pillayar Patti refers to the formation of a "nagaram" named Raja Narayana Puram by the Ainnurruvar community. Pillayarpatti inscriptions also point to Ainnurruva Perun Theru of "En Karikkudi" (Epigraphical Reference 147-150 of 1935-36 - Page 223 Trade and Statecraft in the Ages of Colas by Kenneth R. Hall). According to soe authors this reference is to the present day city of "Karai Kudi".

The present day Nattukottai Chettiars of Tamil Nadu must be the descendants of these "Nattu Cettiar". There are also other indisputable archeological evidences that support this view. The presiding deity of the Mathur Temple (one of the nine of this class that belong to the Nattukkottai Chettiar Community) is named Ainurreeswarar.

See also
Five Hundred Lords of Ayyavolu

Notes

References
 Nilakanta Sastri, K.A. (1955). A History of South India, OUP, New Delhi (Reprinted 2002) .

Guilds in India
Medieval India
Indian merchants
Economic history of India